Election to the Liverpool School Board were held in November 1888. 

There were twenty-seven candidates for the fifteen Board member positions.

Each voter had fifteen votes to cast.

After the election, the composition of the school board was:

* - Retiring board member seeking re-election

Elected

Not Elected

References

1888
1888 English local elections
1880s in Liverpool
November 1888 events